Yano is the debut album of Filipino rock band, Yano. It has 12 tracks and released under Alpha Records in 1994. and re-released under BMG Records (Pilipinas) Inc. in 1998 with additional two tracks from their second album Bawal.

Accolades

* denotes an unordered list

Track listing
"Kumusta Na"  – 3:28
"Tsinelas"  – 2:44
"State U" – 2:47
"Banal Na Aso, Santong Kabayo"  – 4:25
"Trapo" 
"Iskolar Ng Bayan"  – 2:57
"Kaka" – 2:03
"Esem"  – 3:38
"Travel Times" - 4:47
"Mc'Jo"  – 2:51
"Coño Ka P're" - 2:21
"Ate"  - 2;58
"Senti"  - 4:44
"Naroon"  - 3:16

Personnel
Dong Abay – 
Eric Gancio – 
Onie Badiang – 
Nowie Favila –

Notes
 Ate and Travel Times are originally published in their second album Bawal and the latter is actually a remixed version of Dayo.

References

External links
http://www.peyups.com/article.khtml?sid=1809
http://www.peyups.com/dekada90/yano.khtml (written in Tagalog)

1994 albums
Yano albums